V774104 is the internal designation for the trans-Neptunian object designated , but in November 2015 press releases confused it with 541132 Leleākūhonua, which was provisionally designated  and internally designated V302126. as both objects were mentioned at the American Astronomical Society’s Division for Planetary Sciences meeting. Various news articles speculated that V774104 was currently  from the Sun, but its observation arc was too short to know whether its perihelion (closest approach to the Sun) was even outside Neptune's influence.

References 
 

Scattered disc and detached objects
Astronomical objects discovered in 2015
Discoveries by Scott S. Sheppard
Discoveries by Chad Trujillo
Discoveries by David J. Tholen